The Shule Kingdom (Chinese: 疏勒) was an ancient Iranian oasis kingdom of the Taklamakan Desert that was on the Northern Silk Road, in the historical Western Regions of what is now Xinjiang in Northwest China. Its capital was Kashgar, the source of Kashgar's water being a river of the same name. Much like the neighboring people of the Kingdom of Khotan, people of Kashgar spoke Saka, one of the Eastern Iranian languages.

Although a vassal of the Chinese Tang Dynasty from the 7th century, Shule was conquered by the Tibetan Empire in the late 8th century and was eventually incorporated into the Kara-Khanid Khanate during the Islamicisation and Turkicisation of Xinjiang.

History

The earliest mention of the Shule is around 120 BC, by Western Han Chinese when they were exploring their borders. In 127 AD Shule began to pay tribute to the Eastern Han. In 168, following Hede's murder of the current ruler (name unknown), the Han declared war on the Shule, ending in the unsuccessful Siege of Zhenzhong in 170 AD.

By the end of the Eastern Han period (220 AD), Shule had conquered the city-states of Zhenzhong, Yarkent, Jieshi, Qusha, Xiye, and Yinai. In the 5th century the Shule kingdom became a tributary of the Gokturks. They gained independence from the Gokturks in 630, when the Gokturks fell in battle to the Chinese Tang Dynasty. In 632 AD it was vassalized by the Tang, as part of the Tang campaign against the oasis states. Some sources say that they were only made into a tributary and the Tang had very loose suzerainty. After being conquered by the Tang it was part of the Protectorate General to Pacify the West between c. 640 and c. 790. It was one of the stations of the Four Garrisons of Anxi between 649 and 670, after 670 one of the garrisons was changed, but Kashgar was still a seat of the four garrisons.

In 670 AD Shule was conquered by the Tibetan Empire. In 673 the Shule kingdom declared itself a vassal of the Tang, but was not reconquered by the Tang Chinese until 692 AD.

It is alleged and probably untrue that Qutayba ibn Muslim in 715 attacked Kashgar.

Kara Khanid Muslim Turks absorbed Kashgar during the Islamicisation and Turkicisation of Xinjiang. According to Mahmud al-Kashgari within Kashgar's vicinity, some non-Turkic languages like the Kanchaki and Sogdian were still used in some areas. It is believed that the Saka language group was what Kanchaki belonged to. It is believed that the Tarim Basin was linguistically Turkified before the end of the 11th century.

Economy
As it was on the Northern Silk Road, Shule traded mostly through the Yumen Pass and the Pamir Mountains.

The Northern Silk Road that passed through Kashgar split off into the northern Tarim Basin route which ran from Kashgar over Aksu, Kucha, Korla, through the Iron Gate Pass, over Karasahr, Jiaohe, Turpan, Gaochang and Kumul to Anxi. The southern Tarim Basin route ran from Kashgar over Yarkant, Karghalik, Pishan, Khotan, Keriya, Niya, Qarqan, Qarkilik, Miran and Dunhuang to Anxi.

Rulers
Cheng (成) 70
Dou Ti (兜題) 72
Zhong (忠) 74
Cheng Da (成大) 84
An Guo (安國) 116
Yi Fu (遺腹) 125
Chen Pan (臣磐) 127
He De (和得) 168
A Mijue (阿彌厥) 605
Pei Chuo (裴綽) 618
Pei Amozhi (裴阿摩支) 627
Pei Yijian (裴夷健) 698
Pei Anding (裴安定) 728
Pei Guoliang (裴國良) 753
Pei Lengleng (裴冷冷) 784–789? / Tang general – Lu Yang (魯陽) 789

See also

Protectorate General to Pacify the West
Tocharians
Turkestan
Yuezhi

References

Bibliography
  

States and territories established in the 2nd century BC
States and territories disestablished in the 8th century
Former countries in Chinese history
Former country articles requiring a flag
Former kingdoms
Historical Chinese exonyms